The Lucasville  railway station is a decommissioned railway station on the Lapstone Zig Zag that closed in 1892.

John Lucas purchased land for a country retreat adjacent to the top road of the Lapstone ZigZag. He built his house called Lucasville. The house has disappeared but traces of its gardens and access paths are still visible immediately to the west of the ZigZag walking track.

For the convenience of himself, his family, and his guests, Lucas used his political clout to have a railway station built on the Top Road of the ZigZag. Lucasville Station opened in 1877 and the substantial concrete platform, with rock-cut steps leading west into Lucasville grounds.

Today the station is part of the Historic Lapstone Zig Zag walking track.

External links
 Lucasville on NSWRail.net

Disused regional railway stations in New South Wales
Railway stations in Australia opened in 1878
Railway stations closed in 1892
Main Western railway line, New South Wales